The Kentucky Wildcats football program represents the University of Kentucky in the sport of American football. The Wildcats compete in the Football Bowl Subdivision (FBS) of the National Collegiate Athletic Association (NCAA) and the Eastern Division of the Southeastern Conference (SEC). The Wildcats play their home games at Kroger Field in Lexington, Kentucky and are led by head coach Mark Stoops.

History

Early history (1881–1972)

Until about 1913, the modern University of Kentucky was referred to as "Kentucky State College" and nearby Transylvania University was known as "Kentucky University". In 1880, Kentucky University and Centre College played the first intercollegiate football game in Kentucky. Kentucky State first fielded a football team in 1881, playing three games against rival Kentucky University.  The team was revived in 1891. Both the inaugural 1881 squad and the revived 1891 squad have unknown coaches according to university records in winning two games and losing three. The 1891 team's colors were blue and light yellow, decided before the Centre–Kentucky game on December 19. A student asked "What color blue?" and varsity letterman Richard C. Stoll pulled off his necktie, and held it up. This is still held as the origin of Kentucky's shade of blue.  The next year light yellow was dropped and changed to white. The 1892 team was coached by A. M. Miller, Kentucky's first head football coach, and went 2–4–1. The greatest UK team of this era was the 1898 squad, known simply to Kentuckians as "The Immortals." To this day, the Immortals remain the only undefeated, untied, and unscored upon team in UK football history. The Immortals were coached by W. R. Bass and ended the year a perfect 7–0–0, despite an average weight of 147 pounds per player. Victories came easily for this squad, as the Immortals raced by Kentucky University (18–0), Georgetown (28–0), Company H of the 8th Massachusetts (59–0), Louisville Athletic Club (16–0), Centre (6–0), 160th Indiana (17–0) and Newcastle Athletic Club (36–0). Head coach Jack Wright led the team to a 7–1 record in 1903, losing only to rival and southern champion Kentucky University. Fred Schacht posted a 15–4–1 record in two seasons but died unexpectedly after his second season. J. White Guyn also had success leading the Wildcats, posting a 17–7–1 record in his three years. Edwin Sweetland went 16–3 in three seasons (1909–1910 and 1912) but resigned due to poor health. Sweetland also served as Kentucky's first athletics director. The 1909 team upset the Illinois Fighting Illini. Upon their welcome home, Philip Carbusier said that they had "fought like wildcats," a nickname that stuck.

John J. Tigert coached Kentucky for two seasons (1915–1916) with each season having one loss. 1915 captain Charles C. Schrader was All-Southern. The 1916 team fought the Southern Intercollegiate Athletic Association (SIAA) co-champion Tennessee Volunteers to a scoreless tie. The year's only a loss, 45–0 to the Irby Curry-led Vanderbilt Commodores, was the dedication of Stoll Field.  Quarterbacks Curry and Kentucky's Doc Rodes were both selected All-Southern at year's end. Vanderbilt coach Dan McGugin stated "If you would give me Doc Rodes, I would say he was a greater player than Curry." Coach Harry Gamage had a 32–25–5 record during his seven seasons from 1927 to 1933. A.D. Kirwan, who would go on to be the president of the university, coached the Wildcats from 1938 to 1944 and posted a 24–28–4 record in those six seasons. Longtime athletics director Bernie Shively also served as Kentucky's head football coach for the 1945 season.

Coach Paul "Bear" Bryant was Kentucky's head football coach for eight seasons. Bear Bryant came to Kentucky from Maryland. Under Bryant's tutelage, the Wildcats won the 1947 Great Lakes Bowl, lost the 1950 Orange Bowl, won the 1951 Sugar Bowl and the 1952 Cotton Bowl Classic. In final AP polls, the Wildcats were ranked No. 11 in 1949, No. 7 in 1950, No. 15 in 1951, No. 20 in 1952 and No. 16 in 1953. The final 1950 poll was taken prior to the bowl games; Kentucky then defeated undefeated and No. 1 ranked Oklahoma in the Sugar Bowl and finished with the number 1 ranking in 3 major polls, ending the Sooners 31-game winning streak. Bryant won SEC Coach of the Year honors in 1950 and then left after eight seasons to accept the head football coach position at Texas A&M. Assistant coaches at Kentucky under Bryant who went on to become head coaches include Paul Dietzel, Frank Moseley, Jim Owens and Phil Cutchin. Notable players who played for Bryant at Kentucky include Howard Schnellenberger, Jim Mackenzie, Jerry Claiborne, Steve Meilinger, George Blanda, Vito Parilli, and Bob Gain.

Cleveland Browns assistant Blanton Collier was hired to replace Bryant as head football coach at Kentucky in late 1953. After completing his first season at Kentucky, Collier was named SEC Coach of the Year after posting a 7–2 record. Collier's assistants during his tenure at Kentucky included the likes of Bill Arnsparger, Chuck Knox, Howard Schnellenberger, and Don Shula. Despite having a winning record, 41–36–3 in eight seasons, Collier was fired. Collier struggled to recruit for much of his tenure, about which frustrated fans wrote letters of complaint to the university. Collier is the last Kentucky head football coach to leave the Wildcats with a winning record.

Charlie Bradshaw, an Alabama assistant under Bear Bryant, was hired to replace the fired Collier. Despite all the hype about being a Bear Bryant assistant, Bradshaw's tenure turned out to be a disappointment, as he was unable to have much success with the Wildcats. He had a 25–41–5 record in seven seasons. Bradshaw is the last Kentucky coach to defeat Tennessee twice in Knoxville, and the last Kentucky coach to defeat Auburn twice. He was also the last to defeat a No. 1 ranked team in the country until Rich Brooks in 2007. Bradshaw, a harsh, brutal coach, was the head coach of the infamous Thin Thirty Kentucky team. Kentucky had 88 players when Bradshaw arrived, but by season's end, only 30 players were on the team. The story of that team is told in the 2007 book The Thin Thirty by Shannon Ragland. Bradshaw also recruited Nate Northington, the first African American to play in an SEC athletic contest (1967). Notre Dame defensive coordinator John Ray took over as head football coach in late 1969. Ray's teams consistently had solid defenses, but struggled to produce on the offensive end. Ray's teams failed to win more than three games in a single season, going a dismal 10–33 overall in Ray's four seasons. Ray's contract was not renewed after the 1972 season.

Fran Curci era (1973–1981)

Kentucky hired Fran Curci away from Miami after Ray was let go. The 1976 Wildcats tallied their first winning season in 13 years and won the Peach Bowl, finishing No. 18 in the final AP poll. For all intents and purposes, however, Curci's tenure ended soon afterward, when the NCAA slapped the Wildcats with two years' probation for numerous recruiting and amateurism violations.  They were banned from postseason play and live television in 1977.  The most damaging sanction in the long term, however, was being limited to only 25 scholarships in 1977 and 1978. The 1977 Kentucky team went 10–1, went undefeated in SEC play, won a share of the SEC title and finished the season ranked No. 6 in the AP poll. Due to the sanctions, however, the Wildcats were not able to go to a bowl. Kentucky finished at No. 6 and Penn State at No. 5 despite the fact that Kentucky defeated Penn State at Penn State during the regular season. Curci was unable to put together another winning team as a result of the reduced scholarships, and was fired after the 1981 season.

Jerry Claiborne era (1982–1989)

Coach Jerry Claiborne returned to his alma mater from Maryland. After going 0-10-1 in 1982, he led the Wildcats to the 1983 Hall of Fame Bowl and the 1984 Hall of Fame Bowl, defeating a Wisconsin team ranked No. 20 in the polls to finish the season with a 9–3 record and a No. 19 ranking in the final AP and UPI polls. Claiborne also won SEC Coach of the Year honors in 1983. The E.J. Nutter Training Facility was built in 1987. Coach Claiborne and Kentucky experienced an era of constant change at the quarterback position following the 1987 season through his departure that included Ransdell, Wright, and High School All-American and two way starter (Quarterback/Safety) Ricky Lewis, prior to landing Mr. Kentucky Football Awardee Pookie Jones of Calloway County. Claiborne retired following the 1989 season and was inducted into the College Football Hall of Fame as a coach in 1999. He was the last coach to defeat Tennessee until Joker Phillips in 2011 and the last coach to defeat Florida until Mark Stoops in 2018. His final record at Kentucky is 41–46–3.

Bill Curry era (1990–1996)
Bill Curry surprised the college football world by leaving Alabama for Kentucky in late 1989. Despite the high hopes that the Kentucky football program would rise under his leadership, Curry's Wildcats teams never achieved much success. The Wildcats' best season under Curry was 1993, going on to play Clemson in the 1993 Peach Bowl.  It would be his only winning season in seven years.  On the other side of the spectrum, his 1994 team went 1–10, the worst record in modern program history. Curry was asked to resign midway through the 1996 season; he refused and was fired, but was allowed to coach the final five games of '96. The Wildcats were 26-52 (.333) under Curry.

Hal Mumme era (1997–2000)
Coach Hal Mumme came to Kentucky from Valdosta State and brought an exciting, high-scoring, pass-oriented offense known as the "Air Raid". He led the Wildcats to the 1998 Outback Bowl and the 1999 Music City Bowl. Mumme achieved a 20–26 record in his four seasons. Mumme coached star quarterback Tim Couch, the top overall pick in the 1999 NFL Draft. Mumme was popular among the Kentucky fans, but the program was hit with severe sanctions for NCAA violations involving cash payments from an assistant coach to prospective recruits. Mumme resigned after the 2000 season. Assistant coaches under Mumme at Kentucky included Mike Leach and Sonny Dykes. Mumme is the last Kentucky coach to beat Alabama.

Guy Morriss era (2001–2002)
Guy Morriss was promoted from offensive line coach to head coach of the Wildcats after Mumme's resignation. Under coach Morriss, the Wildcats went 2–9 in 2001 but improved to a 7–5 record in 2002. However, the Wildcats were not eligible for postseason play in 2002 due to NCAA sanctions from Mumme's tenure. The most significant event of that season came in a loss to LSU (See: Bluegrass Miracle). Morriss accepted an offer to become the head football coach at Baylor after the 2002 season.

Rich Brooks era (2003–2009)
The team's next head coach was former Oregon head coach Rich Brooks, who was hired in December 2002. In his first season, Kentucky finished 4-8 overall with a 1-7 Southeastern Conference record. The 2003 season included a seven overtime 71-63 loss to Arkansas at Commonwealth Stadium, later renamed Kroger Field. The Wildcats went on to lose their remaining games against Vanderbilt, University of Georgia, and University of Tennessee. Coach Brooks then posted a 2-9 overall and 1-7 conference result in 2004, followed by an improved 3-8 overall and 2-6 SEC conference standing in 2005.

Brooks led the team out of the probationary years to an 8–5 regular season record in 2006, including a memorable upset over the defending SEC champion Georgia, snapping a nine-game losing streak to the Bulldogs. Brooks also led the football team to its first bowl game since 1999 and its first bowl game victory since 1984, as Kentucky defeated the Clemson University Tigers 28–20 in the Music City Bowl on December 29, 2006. In 2007, the Wildcats were ranked 8th in the nation before a loss to South Carolina on October 4. After the loss to South Carolina, Kentucky bounced back on October 13 to defeat the No. 1 LSU 43-37 in a historic triple overtime game. 

Brooks took Kentucky to four consecutive bowl games, winning the first three. The 2007 Kentucky Wildcats football defeated the Florida State Seminoles 35–28 in the 2007 Music City Bowl in Nashville, Tennessee, on December 31, 2007. Quarterback Andre' Woodson was named the Music City Bowl MVP for the second year in a row. In 2008, the Wildcats opted to go to the Liberty Bowl instead of the Music City Bowl and defeated Conference USA champion East Carolina 25–19. In 2009, Brooks and Kentucky returned to the Music City Bowl, losing in a rematch to Clemson 21–13. Brooks retired after seven seasons with a 39–47 overall record.

Joker Phillips era (2010–2012)
Former Wildcat wide receiver and longtime assistant coach Joker Phillips was formally named head coach January 6, 2010 after Brooks' retirement; he had been Brooks' designated successor since 2008. Kentucky started off strong under Phillips with a win on the road against archrival Louisville. The 2010 squad snapped a long-standing losing streak to South Carolina Coach Steve Spurrier by defeating the Gamecocks at Kroger Field. However, they dropped games to both Ole Miss and Mississippi State, lost to a Florida team on a down year and once again failed to beat its other archrival Tennessee, having lost 26 in a row to the Vols, the longest active losing streak by one team to another in college football at the time. The Wildcats capped the season with a 27–10 loss to Pittsburgh in the BBVA Compass Bowl. On November 26, 2011, Kentucky snapped the longest active FBS losing streak to any one team by defeating the Tennessee Vols 10–7 at Kroger Field. On November 4, 2012, the day after a 40–0 home shutout by Vanderbilt resulting with a 1–9 record, UK athletics director Mitch Barnhart released a public letter to Big Blue Nation announcing that Phillips would not return for the 2013 season, but that he would finish out the 2012 season as head coach. With Joker's 5-year contract only being 3 years complete at the end of the season, the university has to pay $2.55 Million over the final 2 years of the contract.

Mark Stoops era (2013–present)

Florida State defensive coordinator Mark Stoops, brother of legendary former Oklahoma head coach Bob Stoops, was hired as Kentucky's head football coach on November 27, 2012. One of Stoops' first moves was hiring offensive coordinator Neal Brown, who brought back the "Air Raid" offense. After nine months as the head coach of the Wildcats, Stoops and his staff signed the highest ranked recruiting class in program history.

Stoops's first season at Kentucky was a struggle, as the Wildcats duplicated the 2–10 record from 2012. Kentucky's wins in 2013 were over a winless Miami (OH) and FCS opponent Alabama State. In Stoops's second season, the Wildcats broke a 17-game SEC losing streak when they beat Vanderbilt the fourth game into the season. The Wildcats finished the 2014 season with a 5–7 record. After the season, offensive coordinator Neal Brown left to take the head coaching job at Troy. In 2015, Stoops's third season, the Wildcats duplicated their 5–7 record from 2014. They lost to Florida, Auburn, Mississippi State, Tennessee, Georgia, Vanderbilt, and Louisville, and they defeated Louisiana-Lafayette, South Carolina, Missouri, Eastern Kentucky and Charlotte.

On December 18, 2015, offensive coordinator Shannon Dawson, who was hired to replace Neal Brown, announced he would not return to the program for the 2016 season as the offensive coordinator, a result of the team's struggles over the previous few years.  In his place Kentucky hired Cincinnati offensive coordinator Eddie Gran as the assistant head coach of offense at Kentucky. Cincinnati quarterbacks coach Darin Hinshaw has also joined the UK staff as quarterbacks coach and co-offensive coordinator. Kentucky began the 2016 season with a loss to Southern Miss by a score of 44–35, after blowing a 25-point lead. Ironically, Shannon Dawson, who was fired by Kentucky as offensive coordinator just months earlier, had been hired to serve as Southern Miss' offensive coordinator. Kentucky would finish 7–6 (4–4 SEC) on the season, which included snapping a five-game losing streak to archrival Louisville by a score of 41–38, with a berth in the TaxSlayer Bowl, their first bowl berth since 2010, a game they lost to Georgia Tech by a score of 33–18. In the 2017 season, the Wildcats opened the season with a victory over Southern Mississippi in Hattiesburg 24–17. The next week, the Wildcats defeated the Eastern Kentucky Colonels in their home opener at the newly renamed Kroger Field in Lexington. Following a road victory over the South Carolina Gamecocks, they failed to defeat the Florida Gators, whom they had not defeated since 1986. This extended the longest losing streak in SEC history to 31 years. Responding to the criticized loss to Florida, the Wildcats defeated Eastern Michigan and Missouri at Kroger Field, improving their record to 5–1. Following their bye week, the Kentucky Wildcats fell to No. 19-ranked Mississippi State team on the road, 45–7. However, the Wildcats improved to 6–2 by defeating the Tennessee Volunteers by a score of 29–26 at Kroger Field. The victory over Tennessee was Kentucky's second victory since 1984 over the Volunteers, and secured bowl eligibility. This was followed by a 37–34 home loss to Ole Miss and a dominating road win over unranked Vanderbilt. The Wildcats then lost to Georgia 42–13 in Athens, Georgia. In their last regular season game against rival Louisville, Kentucky was beaten at home 44–17. Kentucky then proceeded to play Northwestern in Nashville, Tennessee in the Music City Bowl on December 29, and lost 24–23.

In 2018, after beating Central Michigan, Kentucky went to Gainesville to face the Florida Gators, who had won 31 straight against Kentucky, and ended their losing streak with a 27–16 win at The Swamp, the Wildcats' first win in Gainesville since 1979. They added wins in the next two weeks over Murray State and No. 14 Mississippi State, the second of which put Kentucky into the Top 25, the Wildcats' first ranking since 2007. They then split the next two games, defeating South Carolina for the fifth straight season before losing for the first time, an overtime loss to Texas A&M on the road. After the bye week, Kentucky defeated Vanderbilt at home then beat Missouri on the road thanks to a last second TD pass. Those wins put the Wildcats at 7–1 and No. 9 in the College Football Playoff Rankings leading in to a home game against the Georgia Bulldogs. In a matchup that determined the SEC East Division champion, the Wildcats were defeated at home 34–17. Kentucky then went on the road at Tennessee, falling to the Volunteers by a score of 24–7, ending their final SEC record at 5–3, the team's first winning season in conference play since 1977. In Kentucky's final home game of the season, senior day, the Wildcats defeated Middle Tennessee by a score of 34–23. Kentucky closed the regular season with a 56–10 rout of Louisville to win back the Governor's Cup. Kentucky was selected to play in the Citrus Bowl in Orlando, Florida against No. 12 ranked Penn State, and won 27–24. This capped only the third 10-win season in school history, and the first since 1977. The Wildcats finished ranked No. 12 in the AP poll, the first such end-season rank since the 1984 season.

In 2019, Kentucky had a special season when Wide Receiver Lynn Bowden took became the Wildcats Quarterback, when both Terry Wilson (QB 1) and Sawyer Smith (QB 2) were injured.  Kentucky ended the season 8-5, after beating (in order): Toledo, Eastern Michigan, Arkansas, Missouri, Vanderbilt, Tennessee-Martin, Louisville and Virginia Tech in the Belk Bowl in a last minute touchdown drive by Kentucky, and a scoop and score to use up the last few seconds of the game. Their five losses were (in order): Florida, Mississippi State, South Carolina, Georgia and Tennessee. 

In 2020, Kentucky had unique season, despite their final losing record. They were initially ranked at No. 22 in their first game with Auburn.  Their final record in the season was 5-6, with 4-6 in the conference (during the COVID-19 Pandemic NCAA regulations). Kentucky went on to beat: Mississippi State, Tennessee, Vanderbilt, South Carolina, and North Carolina State in the Gator Bowl. Kentucky's losses were to (in order): Auburn, Mississippi, Missouri, Georgia, Alabama and Florida. This season saw the Wildcats win in Knoxville for the first time since 1984. 

In 2021, Kentucky saw more history making for both the entire program and Mark Stoops. Their final record was 10-3, which was Kentucky's second 10-win season, and the 4th time in program history, after beating (in order): Louisiana Monroe, Missouri, UT-Chattanooga, South Carolina, Florida, LSU, Vanderbilt, New Mexico State, Louisville and the Iowa Hawkeyes in the VRBO Citrus Bowl. Their three losses were back-to-back-to-back with: Georgia, Mississippi State, and Tennessee. The Wildcats saw their first win against Florida at home since 1986 and finished ranked No. 18 in the AP poll. The program also got a winning record with 638-635-44 (.501), and a bowl record of 12-9 (.571), after the season concluded.  For Stoops, he managed to get a winning record for the first time, with 59-53 (.527).

The Wildcats and head coach Mark Stoops carried their momentum into the 2022 season where they defeated the Florida Gators at Ben Hill Griffin Stadium for the second time in three attempts after a 31 year drought to the Gators outright prior to the 2018 season. The same week, Stoops surpassed Paul “Bear” Bryant as the all-time winningest coach at The University of Kentucky. 

They currently stand 7-5 overall and 3-5 in conference play at the end of the Regular Season. The win at Missouri clinched bowl eligibility for the 7th consecutive season for the Wildcats, the longest in Kentucky school history.

Conference affiliations
 Independent (1881–1895)
 Southern Intercollegiate Athletic Association (1896–1904)
 Independent (1905–1911)
 Southern Intercollegiate Athletic Association (1912–1921)
 Southern Conference (1922–1932)
 Southeastern Conference (1933–present)

Championships

National championships
The NCAA has never officially recognized a national champion from among the bowl coalition institutions, but in 2004 the NCAA commissioned Jeff Sagarin to use his computer model to retroactively determine the highest ranked teams for the years prior to the BCS. His champion for the 1950 season is Kentucky. The polls for the 1950 national champion, taken before the bowl games were played, list either Oklahoma (AP, Berryman, Helms, Litkenhous, UPI, Williamson), Princeton (Boand, Poling), or Tennessee (Billingsley, DeVold, Dunkel, Missouri, Don Faurot Football Research, National Championship Foundation, Sagarin (ELO-Chess)). Tennessee was the winner of the Cotton Bowl and the only team to beat Kentucky during the 1950 season. Oklahoma was named National Champion by AP and UPI Coaches' Poll, both which awarded their titles before the bowl games. Kentucky would go on to beat Oklahoma in the Sugar Bowl. Sports writer Bill Libby, not an NCAA-designated "major selector", selected Kentucky as national champions in his 1975 book Champions of College Football.

Conference championships
Kentucky has won two conference championships, both in the Southeastern Conference. Kentucky also finished the 1977 season with a 10–1 (6–0 SEC) record, but were not eligible for a share of the SEC championship or for postseason play due to NCAA probation.

† Co-champions

‡ Mississippi State forfeited their 1976 win over Kentucky, giving Kentucky an official 5–1 conference record and a share of the SEC title with Georgia.

Bowl games

UK has played in 21 bowl games, compiling a record of 12–9. Note that in the table below, the year references the season, and not the actual date the game was played.

Rivalries

Louisville

First played in 1912, Louisville-Kentucky football series was revived in 1994 after the success of the basketball series that restarted in 1983. They played the first four games of the renewed series at Commonwealth Stadium (now Kroger Field) until Papa John's Cardinal Stadium (PJCS) was completed in 1997, at which time they began rotating the series between Louisville, Kentucky and Lexington, Kentucky. The two teams play for the Governor's Cup Trophy. Kentucky leads the series 19–15, but trails the modern series 15–13. Kentucky played Louisville in the Cardinals' first 4 seasons and twice in the 1920s, holding the Cardinals scoreless in all contests. Kentucky then left the SIAA in 1922 to become a charter member of the Southeastern Conference and limited its play of in-state schools. It would be 70 years before these two in-state rivals faced each other again.

In 2013, it was announced that the game would be moved to the final game of the season following Louisville's 2014 move to the ACC. This scheduling change fits with other end-of-year SEC vs. ACC rivalry games, such as Georgia vs. Georgia Tech, Florida vs. Florida State and South Carolina vs. Clemson.

In 2018, Kentucky beat Louisville 56–10, winning by the largest margin since the rivalry restarted in 1994. The largest ever win in the rivalry was also by Kentucky which they won 73–0 in 1922, before the series went dormant.

In 2019, Kentucky beat Louisville 45–13. Kentucky quarterback Lynn Bowden broke the SEC record for yards rushing by a QB in a game with 284 total individual rushing yards. Also, the Wildcats broke their single game rushing record with 517 rushing yards against the Cardinals.

Kentucky leads the series 19–15 as of the conclusion of the 2022 season.

Tennessee

Like many college football rivalries, the Tennessee-Kentucky game had its own trophy for many years: a wooden beer barrel painted half blue and half orange. The trophy was awarded to the winner of the game every year from 1925 to 1997. The Barrel was introduced in 1925 by a group of former Kentucky students who wanted to create a material sign of supremacy for the rivalry. It was rolled onto the field that year with the words "Ice Water" painted on it to avoid any outcries over a beer keg symbolizing a college rivalry. The barrel exchange was retired in 1998 after two Kentucky football players died in an alcohol-related crash.

Tennessee leads the series 83–26–9 as of the conclusion of the 2022 season.

Vanderbilt

Having started in 1896, the Kentucky-Vanderbilt football series has been played annually since 1953. The two are divisional opponents in the SEC East. The series rotates annually between Nashville, Tennessee and Lexington, Kentucky. Kentucky leads the series 48–43–4 through the conclusion of the 2022 season.

Individual Awards and Honors

All-Americans
Consensus All-Americans in bold.

First Team All-SEC

SEC Player of the Year

SEC Offensive Player of the Year

SEC Defensive Player of the Year

SEC Coach of the Year

SEC Freshman of the Year

Bednarik Award

Nagurski Award

Outland Trophy

Paul Hornung Award

Ray Guy Award

Wuerffel Trophy

Retired numbers

Hall of Famers

Pro
Two Kentucky players have been inducted into the Pro Football Hall of Fame.

College
Seven Kentucky Wildcat individuals have been inducted into the College Football Hall of Fame.

Future opponents and schedules

Conference and non-conference opponents

SEC West opponents
Kentucky plays Mississippi State as a permanent non-division opponent annually and rotates around the West division among the other six schools.

Non-conference opponents
Announced schedules as of April 26, 2020.

References

External links

 

 
American football teams established in 1891
1891 establishments in Kentucky